UFC 64: Unstoppable was a mixed martial arts event held by the Ultimate Fighting Championship on Saturday, October 14, 2006. The event took place at the Mandalay Bay Events Center, on the Las Vegas Strip in Nevada and was broadcast live on pay-per-view in the United States and Canada.

Background
The card centered on a UFC Middleweight Championship defense by Rich Franklin against the highly touted Anderson Silva. 

The card also featured a UFC Lightweight Championship bout between The Ultimate Fighter alumnus Kenny Florian and longtime UFC veteran Sean Sherk. It was the first Lightweight Championship bout since UFC 41 in 2003, when B.J. Penn and Caol Uno fought to a draw.

A planned match between Keith Jardine and Mike Nickels was cancelled a day before the event when Nickels reaggravated a previous back injury sustained during training. A replacement could not be found on short notice.

Clay Guida made his UFC debut at this event.

Results

Bonus awards
Fight of the Night: Sean Sherk vs. Kenny Florian
Knockout of the Night: Anderson Silva
Submission of the Night: Clay Guida

See also
 Ultimate Fighting Championship
 List of UFC champions
 List of UFC events
 2006 in UFC

References

External links
Official UFC 64 PPV Website
Official UFC Website
UFC 64 Fighter Salary Breakdown

Ultimate Fighting Championship events
2006 in mixed martial arts
Mixed martial arts in Las Vegas
2006 in sports in Nevada